Zarechye is the name of several inhabited localities in Russia.

Belgorod Oblast
As of 2010, two rural localities in Belgorod Oblast bear this name:
Zarechye, Korochansky District, Belgorod Oblast, a khutor in Korochansky District
Zarechye, Shebekinsky District, Belgorod Oblast, a khutor in Shebekinsky District

Bryansk Oblast
As of 2010, fourteen rural localities in Bryansk Oblast bear this name:
Zarechye, Lopatensky Selsoviet, Klintsovsky District, Bryansk Oblast, a village in Lopatensky Selsoviet of Klintsovsky District
Zarechye, Turosnyansky Selsoviet, Klintsovsky District, Bryansk Oblast, a settlement in Turosnyansky Selsoviet of Klintsovsky District
Zarechye, Komarichsky District, Bryansk Oblast, a settlement in Yevdokimovsky Selsoviet of Komarichsky District
Zarechye, Krasnogorsky District, Bryansk Oblast, a settlement in Kibirshchinsky Selsoviet of Krasnogorsky District
Zarechye, Oskolkovsky Selsoviet, Mglinsky District, Bryansk Oblast, a settlement in Oskolkovsky Selsoviet of Mglinsky District
Zarechye, Velikodubrovsky Selsoviet, Mglinsky District, Bryansk Oblast, a settlement in Velikodubrovsky Selsoviet of Mglinsky District
Zarechye, Vetlevsky Selsoviet, Mglinsky District, Bryansk Oblast, a settlement in Vetlevsky Selsoviet of Mglinsky District
Zarechye, Gushchinsky Selsoviet, Pochepsky District, Bryansk Oblast, a village in Gushchinsky Selsoviet of Pochepsky District
Zarechye, Krasnorogsky Selsoviet, Pochepsky District, Bryansk Oblast, a settlement in Krasnorogsky Selsoviet of Pochepsky District
Zarechye, Shumorovsky Selsoviet, Pochepsky District, Bryansk Oblast, a settlement in Shumorovsky Selsoviet of Pochepsky District
Zarechye, Supryaginsky Selsoviet, Pochepsky District, Bryansk Oblast, a village in Supryaginsky Selsoviet of Pochepsky District
Zarechye, Valuyetsky Selsoviet, Pochepsky District, Bryansk Oblast, a village in Valuyetsky Selsoviet of Pochepsky District
Zarechye, Gorodetsky Selsoviet, Vygonichsky District, Bryansk Oblast, a settlement in Gorodetsky Selsoviet of Vygonichsky District
Zarechye, Khmelevsky Selsoviet, Vygonichsky District, Bryansk Oblast, a settlement in Khmelevsky Selsoviet of Vygonichsky District

Republic of Buryatia
As of 2010, one rural locality in the Republic of Buryatia bears this name:
Zarechye, Republic of Buryatia, a selo in Sukhinsky Selsoviet of Kabansky District

Chelyabinsk Oblast
As of 2010, one rural locality in Chelyabinsk Oblast bears this name:
Zarechye, Chelyabinsk Oblast, a settlement in Pokrovsky Selsoviet of Varnensky District

Irkutsk Oblast
As of 2010, one rural locality in Irkutsk Oblast bears this name:
Zarechye, Irkutsk Oblast, a village in Nizhneudinsky District

Ivanovo Oblast
As of 2010, two rural localities in Ivanovo Oblast bear this name:
Zarechye, Ivanovsky District, Ivanovo Oblast, a village in Ivanovsky District
Zarechye, Komsomolsky District, Ivanovo Oblast, a village in Komsomolsky District

Kaliningrad Oblast
As of 2010, four rural localities in Kaliningrad Oblast bear this name:
Zarechye, Chernyakhovsky District, Kaliningrad Oblast, a settlement in Svobodnensky Rural Okrug of Chernyakhovsky District
Zarechye, Guryevsky District, Kaliningrad Oblast, a settlement in Dobrinsky Rural Okrug of Guryevsky District
Zarechye, Gvardeysky District, Kaliningrad Oblast, a settlement in Ozerkovsky Rural Okrug of Gvardeysky District
Zarechye, Polessky District, Kaliningrad Oblast, a settlement in Zalesovsky Rural Okrug of Polessky District

Kaluga Oblast
As of 2010, six rural localities in Kaluga Oblast bear this name:
Zarechye, Kaluga, Kaluga Oblast, a village under the administrative jurisdiction of the city of Kaluga
Zarechye, Baryatinsky District, Kaluga Oblast, a selo in Baryatinsky District
Zarechye, Borovsky District, Kaluga Oblast, a village in Borovsky District
Zarechye (selo), Kozelsky District, Kaluga Oblast, a selo in Kozelsky District
Zarechye (village), Kozelsky District, Kaluga Oblast, a village in Kozelsky District
Zarechye, Ulyanovsky District, Kaluga Oblast, a selo in Ulyanovsky District

Republic of Karelia
As of 2010, two rural localities in the Republic of Karelia bear this name:
Zarechye, Sortavala, Republic of Karelia, a settlement under the administrative jurisdiction of the city of republic significance of Sortavala
Zarechye, Medvezhyegorsky District, Republic of Karelia, a village in Medvezhyegorsky District

Kirov Oblast
As of 2010, one rural locality in Kirov Oblast bears this name:
Zarechye, Kirov Oblast, a selo in Zarechensky Rural Okrug of Podosinovsky District

Komi Republic
As of 2010, one rural locality in the Komi Republic bears this name:
Zarechye, Komi Republic, a village in Kozhmudor selo Administrative Territory of Ust-Vymsky District

Kostroma Oblast
As of 2010, six rural localities in Kostroma Oblast bear this name:
Zarechye, Galichsky District, Kostroma Oblast, a village in Dmitriyevskoye Settlement of Galichsky District
Zarechye, Kostromskoy District, Kostroma Oblast, a village in Baksheyevskoye Settlement of Kostromskoy District
Zarechye, Krasnoselsky District, Kostroma Oblast, a village in Chapayevskoye Settlement of Krasnoselsky District
Zarechye, Makaryevsky District, Kostroma Oblast, a village in Yurkinskoye Settlement of Makaryevsky District
Zarechye, Nerekhtsky District, Kostroma Oblast, a village in Volzhskoye Settlement of Nerekhtsky District
Zarechye, Vokhomsky District, Kostroma Oblast, a village in Tikhonovskoye Settlement of Vokhomsky District

Kurgan Oblast
As of 2010, two rural localities in Kurgan Oblast bear this name:
Zarechye, Kargapolsky District, Kurgan Oblast, a village in Maysky Selsoviet of Kargapolsky District
Zarechye, Kataysky District, Kurgan Oblast, a settlement in Ilyinsky Selsoviet of Kataysky District

Kursk Oblast
As of 2010, nine rural localities in Kursk Oblast bear this name:
Zarechye, Cheremisinovsky District, Kursk Oblast, a village in Stakanovsky Selsoviet of Cheremisinovsky District
Zarechye, Fatezhsky District, Kursk Oblast, a khutor in Rusanovsky Selsoviet of Fatezhsky District
Zarechye, Khomutovsky District, Kursk Oblast, a settlement in Romanovsky Selsoviet of Khomutovsky District
Zarechye, Manturovsky District, Kursk Oblast, a selo in Zarechensky Selsoviet of Manturovsky District
Zarechye, Oktyabrsky District, Kursk Oblast, a khutor in Starkovsky Selsoviet of Oktyabrsky District
Zarechye, Shchigrovsky District, Kursk Oblast, a village in Bolshezmeinsky Selsoviet of Shchigrovsky District
Zarechye, Sovetsky District, Kursk Oblast, a village in Krasnodolinsky Selsoviet of Sovetsky District
Zarechye, Timsky District, Kursk Oblast, a village in Zarechensky Selsoviet of Timsky District
Zarechye, Zheleznogorsky District, Kursk Oblast, a khutor in Nizhnezhdanovsky Selsoviet of Zheleznogorsky District

Leningrad Oblast
As of 2010, seven rural localities in Leningrad Oblast bear this name:
Zarechye, Boksitogorsky District, Leningrad Oblast, a village in Bolshedvorskoye Settlement Municipal Formation of Boksitogorsky District
Zarechye, Kingiseppsky District, Leningrad Oblast, a village in Bolshelutskoye Settlement Municipal Formation of Kingiseppsky District
Zarechye, Luzhsky District, Leningrad Oblast, a village in Skreblovskoye Settlement Municipal Formation of Luzhsky District
Zarechye, Tikhvinsky District, Leningrad Oblast, a village in Shugozerskoye Settlement Municipal Formation of Tikhvinsky District
Zarechye, Berezhkovskoye Settlement Municipal Formation, Volkhovsky District, Leningrad Oblast, a village in Berezhkovskoye Settlement Municipal Formation of Volkhovsky District
Zarechye, Selivanovskoye Settlement Municipal Formation, Volkhovsky District, Leningrad Oblast, a village in Selivanovskoye Settlement Municipal Formation of Volkhovsky District
Zarechye, Vyborgsky District, Leningrad Oblast, a logging depot settlement under the administrative jurisdiction of Primorskoye Settlement Municipal Formation of Vyborgsky District

Lipetsk Oblast
As of 2010, one rural locality in Lipetsk Oblast bears this name:
Zarechye, Lipetsk Oblast, a settlement in Preobrazhensky Selsoviet of Izmalkovsky District

Moscow Oblast
As of 2010, four inhabited localities in Moscow Oblast bear this name:
Zarechye, Zarechye Work Settlement, Odintsovsky District, Moscow Oblast, an urban locality (a work settlement) in Odintsovsky District
Zarechye, Mozhaysky District, Moscow Oblast, a rural locality (a  village) in Borisovskoye Rural Settlement of Mozhaysky District, Moscow Oblast
Zarechye, Uspenskoye Rural Settlement, Odintsovsky District, Moscow Oblast, a rural locality (a settlement) in Uspenskoye Rural Settlement of Odintsovsky District
Zarechye, Yegoryevsky District, Moscow Oblast, a rural locality (a village) in Savvinskoye Rural Settlement of Yegoryevsky District

Novgorod Oblast
As of 2010, fifteen rural localities in Novgorod Oblast bear this name:
Zarechye, Khvoyninsky District, Novgorod Oblast, a village in Ostakhnovskoye Settlement of Khvoyninsky District
Zarechye, Novorakhinskoye Settlement, Krestetsky District, Novgorod Oblast, a village in Novorakhinskoye Settlement of Krestetsky District
Zarechye, Ruchyevskoye Settlement, Krestetsky District, Novgorod Oblast, a village in Ruchyevskoye Settlement of Krestetsky District
Zarechye, Lyubytinsky District, Novgorod Oblast, a village under the administrative jurisdiction of Nebolchskoye Settlement of Lyubytinsky District
Zarechye, Malovishersky District, Novgorod Oblast, a village in Verebyinskoye Settlement of Malovishersky District
Zarechye, Maryovsky District, Novgorod Oblast, a village in Velilskoye Settlement of Maryovsky District
Zarechye, Novgorodsky District, Novgorod Oblast, a village under the administrative jurisdiction of Proletarskoye Settlement of Novgorodsky District
Zarechye, Okulovsky District, Novgorod Oblast, a village in Berezovikskoye Settlement of Okulovsky District
Zarechye, Pestovsky District, Novgorod Oblast, a village in Bogoslovskoye Settlement of Pestovsky District
Zarechye, Poddorsky District, Novgorod Oblast, a village in Seleyevskoye Settlement of Poddorsky District
Zarechye, Shimsky District, Novgorod Oblast, a village in Medvedskoye Settlement of Shimsky District
Zarechye, Soletsky District, Novgorod Oblast, a village in Gorskoye Settlement of Soletsky District
Zarechye, Starorussky District, Novgorod Oblast, a village in Velikoselskoye Settlement of Starorussky District
Zarechye, Gorskoye Settlement, Volotovsky District, Novgorod Oblast, a village in Gorskoye Settlement of Volotovsky District
Zarechye, Slavitinskoye Settlement, Volotovsky District, Novgorod Oblast, a village in Slavitinskoye Settlement of Volotovsky District

Novosibirsk Oblast
As of 2010, one rural locality in Novosibirsk Oblast bears this name:
Zarechye, Novosibirsk Oblast, a selo in Vengerovsky District

Oryol Oblast
As of 2010, six rural localities in Oryol Oblast bear this name:
Zarechye, Korsakovsky District, Oryol Oblast, a village in Korsakovsky Selsoviet of Korsakovsky District
Zarechye, Kromskoy District, Oryol Oblast, a village in Koroskovsky Selsoviet of Kromskoy District
Zarechye, Mtsensky District, Oryol Oblast, a settlement in Spassko-Lutovinovsky Selsoviet of Mtsensky District
Zarechye, Novosilsky District, Oryol Oblast, a selo in Zarechensky Selsoviet of Novosilsky District
Zarechye, Orlovsky District, Oryol Oblast, a settlement in Troitsky Selsoviet of Orlovsky District
Zarechye, Sverdlovsky District, Oryol Oblast, a settlement in Nikolsky Selsoviet of Sverdlovsky District

Pskov Oblast
As of 2010, seventeen rural localities in Pskov Oblast bear this name:
Zarechye, Bezhanitsky District, Pskov Oblast, a village in Bezhanitsky District
Zarechye, Dedovichsky District, Pskov Oblast, a village in Dedovichsky District
Zarechye, Krasnogorodsky District, Pskov Oblast, a village in Krasnogorodsky District
Zarechye, Loknyansky District, Pskov Oblast, a village in Loknyansky District
Zarechye, Nevelsky District, Pskov Oblast, a village in Nevelsky District
Zarechye, Novorzhevsky District, Pskov Oblast, a village in Novorzhevsky District
Zarechye (Okniyskaya Rural Settlement), Novosokolnichesky District, Pskov Oblast, a village in Novosokolnichesky District; municipally, a part of Okniyskaya Rural Settlement of that district
Zarechye (Nasvinskaya Rural Settlement), Novosokolnichesky District, Pskov Oblast, a village in Novosokolnichesky District; municipally, a part of Nasvinskaya Rural Settlement of that district
Zarechye, Plyussky District, Pskov Oblast, a village in Plyussky District
Zarechye (Tugotinskaya Rural Settlement), Porkhovsky District, Pskov Oblast, a village in Porkhovsky District; municipally, a part of Tugotinskaya Rural Settlement of that district
Zarechye (Pavskaya Rural Settlement), Porkhovsky District, Pskov Oblast, a village in Porkhovsky District; municipally, a part of Pavskaya Rural Settlement of that district
Zarechye (Dubrovenskaya Rural Settlement), Porkhovsky District, Pskov Oblast, a village in Porkhovsky District; municipally, a part of Dubrovenskaya Rural Settlement of that district
Zarechye, Pskovsky District, Pskov Oblast, a village in Pskovsky District
Zarechye (Alolskaya Rural Settlement), Pustoshkinsky District, Pskov Oblast, a village in Pustoshkinsky District; municipally, a part of Alolskaya Rural Settlement of that district
Zarechye (Gultyayevskaya Rural Settlement), Pustoshkinsky District, Pskov Oblast, a village in Pustoshkinsky District; municipally, a part of Gultyayevskaya Rural Settlement of that district
Zarechye (Gultyayevskaya Rural Settlement), Pustoshkinsky District, Pskov Oblast, a village in Pustoshkinsky District; municipally, a part of Gultyayevskaya Rural Settlement of that district
Zarechye, Strugo-Krasnensky District, Pskov Oblast, a village in Strugo-Krasnensky District

Ryazan Oblast
As of 2010, six rural localities in Ryazan Oblast bear this name:
Zarechye, Korablinsky District, Ryazan Oblast, a settlement in Klyuchansky Rural Okrug of Korablinsky District
Zarechye, Mikhaylovsky District, Ryazan Oblast, a settlement in Ilyichevsky Rural Okrug of Mikhaylovsky District
Zarechye, Alexandro-Nevsky District, Ryazan Oblast, a settlement in Mikhalkovsky Rural Okrug of Alexandro-Nevsky District
Zarechye, Sarayevsky District, Ryazan Oblast, a settlement in Krivsky Rural Okrug of Sarayevsky District
Zarechye, Spassky District, Ryazan Oblast, a selo in Zarechinsky Rural Okrug of Spassky District
Zarechye, Ukholovsky District, Ryazan Oblast, a selo in Konoplinsky Rural Okrug of Ukholovsky District

Samara Oblast
As of 2010, two rural localities in Samara Oblast bear this name:
Zarechye, Kinelsky District, Samara Oblast, a settlement in Kinelsky District
Zarechye, Koshkinsky District, Samara Oblast, a settlement in Koshkinsky District

Smolensk Oblast
As of 2010, seven rural localities in Smolensk Oblast bear this name:
Zarechye, Gagarinsky District, Smolensk Oblast, a village in Akatovskoye Rural Settlement of Gagarinsky District
Zarechye, Khislavichsky District, Smolensk Oblast, a village in Kozhukhovichskoye Rural Settlement of Khislavichsky District
Zarechye, Pochinkovsky District, Smolensk Oblast, a village in Lysovskoye Rural Settlement of Pochinkovsky District
Zarechye, Prigoryevskoye Rural Settlement, Roslavlsky District, Smolensk Oblast, a village in Prigoryevskoye Rural Settlement of Roslavlsky District
Zarechye, Yepishevskoye Rural Settlement, Roslavlsky District, Smolensk Oblast, a village in Yepishevskoye Rural Settlement of Roslavlsky District
Zarechye, Rudnyansky District, Smolensk Oblast, a village in Lyubavichskoye Rural Settlement of Rudnyansky District
Zarechye, Ugransky District, Smolensk Oblast, a village in Velikopolyevskoye Rural Settlement of Ugransky District

Tambov Oblast
As of 2010, four rural localities in Tambov Oblast bear this name:
Zarechye, Bondarsky District, Tambov Oblast, a settlement in Kershinsky Selsoviet of Bondarsky District
Zarechye, Pichayevsky District, Tambov Oblast, a selo in Yegorovsky Selsoviet of Pichayevsky District
Zarechye, Sosnovsky District, Tambov Oblast, a village in Perkinsky Selsoviet of Sosnovsky District
Zarechye, Tambovsky District, Tambov Oblast, a settlement in Tatanovsky Selsoviet of Tambovsky District

Republic of Tatarstan
As of 2010, one rural locality in the Republic of Tatarstan bears this name:
Zarechye, Republic of Tatarstan, a settlement in Aznakayevsky District

Tver Oblast
As of 2010, twenty-three rural localities in Tver Oblast bear this name:
Zarechye, Bezhetsky District, Tver Oblast, a village in Bezhetsky District
Zarechye, Firovsky District, Tver Oblast, a village in Firovsky District
Zarechye (Kulitskoye Rural Settlement), Kalininsky District, Tver Oblast, a village in Kalininsky District; municipally, a part of Kulitskoye Rural Settlement of that district
Zarechye (Turginovskoye Rural Settlement), Kalininsky District, Tver Oblast, a village in Kalininsky District; municipally, a part of Turginovskoye Rural Settlement of that district
Zarechye, Kalyazinsky District, Tver Oblast, a village in Kalyazinsky District
Zarechye, Kashinsky District, Tver Oblast, a village in Kashinsky District
Zarechye, Konakovsky District, Tver Oblast, a village in Konakovsky District
Zarechye, Lesnoy District, Tver Oblast, a village in Lesnoy District
Zarechye, Maksatikhinsky District, Tver Oblast, a khutor in Maksatikhinsky District
Zarechye, Molokovsky District, Tver Oblast, a village in Molokovsky District
Zarechye, Ostashkovsky District, Tver Oblast, a village in Ostashkovsky District
Zarechye, Ostashkovsky District, Tver Oblast, a village in Ostashkovsky District
Zarechye, Penovsky District, Tver Oblast, a village in Penovsky District
Zarechye, Rameshkovsky District, Tver Oblast, a village in Rameshkovsky District
Zarechye, Sandovsky District, Tver Oblast, a village in Sandovsky District
Zarechye, Selizharovsky District, Tver Oblast, a village in Selizharovsky District
Zarechye, Sonkovsky District, Tver Oblast, a village in Sonkovsky District
Zarechye, Staritsky District, Tver Oblast, a village in Staritsky District
Zarechye (Ploskoshskoye Rural Settlement), Toropetsky District, Tver Oblast, a village in Toropetsky District; municipally, a part of Ploskoshskoye Rural Settlement of that district
Zarechye (Vasilevskoye Rural Settlement), Toropetsky District, Tver Oblast, a village in Toropetsky District; municipally, a part of Vasilevskoye Rural Settlement of that district
Zarechye, Torzhoksky District, Tver Oblast, a village in Torzhoksky District
Zarechye, Vyshnevolotsky District, Tver Oblast, a village in Vyshnevolotsky District
Zarechye, Zapadnodvinsky District, Tver Oblast, a village in Zapadnodvinsky District

Vladimir Oblast
As of 2010, two rural localities in Vladimir Oblast bear this name:
Zarechye, Kirzhachsky District, Vladimir Oblast, a selo in Kirzhachsky District
Zarechye, Selivanovsky District, Vladimir Oblast, a village in Selivanovsky District

Vologda Oblast
As of 2010, nineteen rural localities in Vologda Oblast bear this name:
Zarechye, Babayevsky District, Vologda Oblast, a village in Pyazhozersky Selsoviet of Babayevsky District
Zarechye, Korotovsky Selsoviet, Cherepovetsky District, Vologda Oblast, a village in Korotovsky Selsoviet of Cherepovetsky District
Zarechye, Nikolo-Ramensky Selsoviet, Cherepovetsky District, Vologda Oblast, a village in Nikolo-Ramensky Selsoviet of Cherepovetsky District
Zarechye, Minkinsky Selsoviet, Gryazovetsky District, Vologda Oblast, a village in Minkinsky Selsoviet of Gryazovetsky District
Zarechye, Pokrovsky Selsoviet, Gryazovetsky District, Vologda Oblast, a village in Pokrovsky Selsoviet of Gryazovetsky District
Zarechye, Vederkovsky Selsoviet, Gryazovetsky District, Vologda Oblast, a village in Vederkovsky Selsoviet of Gryazovetsky District
Zarechye, Vederkovsky Selsoviet, Gryazovetsky District, Vologda Oblast, a village in Vederkovsky Selsoviet of Gryazovetsky District
Zarechye, Kichmengsko-Gorodetsky District, Vologda Oblast, a village in Trofimovsky Selsoviet of Kichmengsko-Gorodetsky District
Zarechye, Charozersky Selsoviet, Kirillovsky District, Vologda Oblast, a village in Charozersky Selsoviet of Kirillovsky District
Zarechye, Goritsky Selsoviet, Kirillovsky District, Vologda Oblast, a village in Goritsky Selsoviet of Kirillovsky District
Zarechye, Nikolo-Torzhsky Selsoviet, Kirillovsky District, Vologda Oblast, a village in Nikolo-Torzhsky Selsoviet of Kirillovsky District
Zarechye, Mezhdurechensky District, Vologda Oblast, a village in Nozemsky Selsoviet of Mezhdurechensky District
Zarechye, Nyuksensky District, Vologda Oblast, a village in Bobrovsky Selsoviet of Nyuksensky District
Zarechye, Sheksninsky District, Vologda Oblast, a village in Charomsky Selsoviet of Sheksninsky District
Zarechye, Dvinitsky Selsoviet, Sokolsky District, Vologda Oblast, a village in Dvinitsky Selsoviet of Sokolsky District
Zarechye, Zamoshsky Selsoviet, Sokolsky District, Vologda Oblast, a village in Zamoshsky Selsoviet of Sokolsky District
Zarechye, Ilezsky Selsoviet, Tarnogsky District, Vologda Oblast, a village in Ilezsky Selsoviet of Tarnogsky District
Zarechye, Markushevsky Selsoviet, Tarnogsky District, Vologda Oblast, a village in Markushevsky Selsoviet of Tarnogsky District
Zarechye, Ust-Kubinsky District, Vologda Oblast, a village in Bogorodsky Selsoviet of Ust-Kubinsky District

Voronezh Oblast
As of 2010, three rural localities in Voronezh Oblast bear this name:
Zarechye, Khokholsky District, Voronezh Oblast, a khutor in Yablochenskoye Rural Settlement of Khokholsky District
Zarechye, Repyovsky District, Voronezh Oblast, a khutor in Skoritskoye Rural Settlement of Repyovsky District
Zarechye, Ternovsky District, Voronezh Oblast, a settlement in Kostino-Otdelskoye Rural Settlement of Ternovsky District

Yaroslavl Oblast
As of 2010, nine rural localities in Yaroslavl Oblast bear this name:
Zarechye, Borisoglebsky District, Yaroslavl Oblast, a village in Demyanovsky Rural Okrug of Borisoglebsky District
Zarechye, Danilovsky District, Yaroslavl Oblast, a village in Trofimovsky Rural Okrug of Danilovsky District
Zarechye, Gavrilov-Yamsky District, Yaroslavl Oblast, a selo in Ilyinsky Rural Okrug of Gavrilov-Yamsky District
Zarechye, Fatyanovsky Rural Okrug, Rostovsky District, Yaroslavl Oblast, a village in Fatyanovsky Rural Okrug of Rostovsky District
Zarechye, Novo-Nikolsky Rural Okrug, Rostovsky District, Yaroslavl Oblast, a village in Novo-Nikolsky Rural Okrug of Rostovsky District
Zarechye, Perovsky Rural Okrug, Rostovsky District, Yaroslavl Oblast, a village in Perovsky Rural Okrug of Rostovsky District
Zarechye, Ugodichsky Rural Okrug, Rostovsky District, Yaroslavl Oblast, a village in Ugodichsky Rural Okrug of Rostovsky District
Zarechye, Rybinsky District, Yaroslavl Oblast, a village in Pogorelsky Rural Okrug of Rybinsky District
Zarechye, Uglichsky District, Yaroslavl Oblast, a village in Ploskinsky Rural Okrug of Uglichsky District